The Kennesaw State Owls men's basketball statistical leaders are individual statistical leaders of the Kennesaw State Owls men's basketball program in various categories, including points, rebounds, assists, steals, and blocks. Within those areas, the lists identify single-game, single-season, and career leaders. The Owls represent Kennesaw State University in the NCAA's ASUN Conference.

Kennesaw State began competing in intercollegiate basketball in 1985.  These lists are updated through the end of the 2020–21 season.

Scoring

Rebounds

Assists

Steals

Blocks

References

Lists of college basketball statistical leaders by team
Statistical